Challenor is a surname. Notable people with the surname include:

 Aimee Challenor (born 1997), British politician and transgender activist
 Edward Challenor (1873–1935), British Army officer and cricketer
 George Challenor (1888–1947), West Indian cricketer 
 Harold Challenor (1922–2008), police officer
 Herschelle Sullivan Challenor (born 1938), foreign policy expert, international civil servant, university administrator, and activist
 Jenna Challenor (born 1981), South African long-distance runner
 Tracey Challenor, journalist, media consultant, news presenter, and reporter